KVGC (1340 AM) is a radio station licensed to Jackson, California. The station broadcasts a Full service format airing classic hits music and is owned by Mother Lode Broadcasting.

References

External links
KVGC's official website

Classic hits radio stations in the United States
Full service radio stations in the United States
VGC